Isukapalli is a village in Repalle of Andhra Pradesh, India.

References

Villages in Guntur district